Hossein Alaei is an Iranian retired military officer who served as the CEO of Iran Aseman Airlines from 2013 to 2018. During his military career, Alaei was among senior Islamic Revolutionary Guard Corps commanders, having served as its commander in two northwestern provinces, Karbala HQ, maritime forces and the joint staff. He was also defense minister's deputy in the 1990s and early 2000s.

In 2013, Alaei was Hassan Rouhani's first choice for minister of defense, however he was reportedly rejected by the Supreme Leader Ali Khamenei.

Controversy
In January 2012, Alaei wrote an op-ed for the newspaper Ettela'at that sparked controversy. He implicitly compared Ali Khamenei to the late Shah, posing hypothetical questions that the Shah could have asked himself. He then finished with a verse from Quran: "Thus, learn your lesson you who have eyes." Following harsh criticism coming from the establishment, he said his article had been misinterpreted.

References

Living people
Islamic Revolutionary Guard Corps brigadier generals
Islamic Revolutionary Guard Corps personnel of the Iran–Iraq War
Year of birth missing (living people)
People from Markazi Province